Michael Almebäck (born 4 April 1988) is a Swedish professional footballer who plays as a central defender.

Club career

Career
After being rejected by IF Brommapojkarna, Almebäck received an opportunity to play at Örebro SK and the move can be considered a success. Almebäck's breakthrough season was in 2009, when he became part of the Örebro's defensive line. He was one of Örebros best players that season and Almebäck was elected the Örebro SK:s 'Player of the Year' that season. After the summer break of 2009, Almebäck was nominated for the "Newcomer of the Year" award in Swedish football, which he failed to win.

In the summer of 2011, Almebäck signed for Belgian title contenders Club Brugge, where he immediately became a regular first team player. Almebäck scored his first goal for Club Brugge during a friendly against Tubize on the 7th of July.

In the summer of 2013 he signed a 3-year contract with the Danish club Brøndby IF.

In the winter of 2016, Almebäck returned to the Swedish top tier club Örebro SK, signing a 3-year contract.

External links
 
 
 
 
 

Swedish footballers
Living people
1988 births
Footballers from Stockholm
IF Brommapojkarna players
Örebro SK players
Club Brugge KV players
Brøndby IF players
Esbjerg fB players
Allsvenskan players
Belgian Pro League players
Danish Superliga players
Sweden international footballers
Sweden under-21 international footballers
Swedish expatriate footballers
Expatriate footballers in Belgium
Swedish expatriate sportspeople in Belgium
Expatriate men's footballers in Denmark
Swedish expatriate sportspeople in Denmark
Association football defenders